Bernabé Piedrabuena (November 10, 1863 – June 11, 1942) was an Argentine bishop. Underneath his bishopric, the Diocese of Catamarca was separated from the Archdiocese of Tucumán on 21 January 1910.

The son of Bernabé Piedrabuena and Merćedes Mariño, Bernabé was educated at the seminary at the Archdiocese of Salta, beginning at age 11. Following his ordination in 1886, he was appointed a professor at the seminary; he would later become rector.

References

Argentine bishops
1863 births
1942 deaths
People from San Miguel de Tucumán